Pierre-André Dumas (born September 26, 1962 in Saint-Jean-du-Sud) is a Haitian clergyman and bishop for the Roman Catholic Diocese of Anse-à-Veau and Miragoâne. He was ordained in 1991. He was appointed bishop in 2008. Dumas was removed from the episcopacy in 2023 after being found guilty of illegal detainment and the theft of a church monstrance.

References

External links

Haitian Roman Catholic bishops
People from Sud (department)
Living people
1962 births
Roman Catholic bishops of Anse-à-Veau and Miragoâne
Roman Catholic bishops of Port-au-Prince
21st-century Roman Catholic bishops in Haiti